Judith Lennox is a British writer of romance novels.

Bibliography

Historic novels 
 Catching the Tide (2011)
 The Heart of the Night (2009)
 Before the Storm (2008)
 A Step in the Dark (2007)
 All My Sisters (2005)
 Shadow Child (1999)
 Footprints on the Sand (1998)
 The Winter House (1996)
 The Secret Years (1994)
 The Italian Garden (1993)
 Till The Day Goes Down (1992)
 The Glittering Strand (1991)

Other novels
 One Last Dance (2014)
 The Turning Point (2012)
 Middlemere (2004)
 Written on Glass (2003) 
 The Dark-eyed Girls (2001)
  Breaking Out (1998)
 Some Old Lover´s Ghost (1996)

References

External links 
 
 Harper Collins

English romantic fiction writers
Women romantic fiction writers
Living people
Year of birth missing (living people)